Valley of the Kings is a valley in Egypt holding the tombs of many kings and nobles.

Valley of the Kings may  also refer to:

 Valley of the Kings (Tibet), tumuli believed to contain the tombs of Tibetan kings in Tibet
 Valley of the Kings (film), a 1954 adventure film made by Metro-Goldwyn-Mayer
 Valley of the Kings (1964), written by Jean Scott Rogers
 Valley of the Kings (EP), a 1997 EP by Gamma Ray
 "Valley of the Kings", a song by Blue Murder from the 1989 album Blue Murder
 "Valley of the Kings", a song by Hagar Schon Aaronson Shrieve from the 1984 album Through the Fire

See also
 In the Valley of the Kings, a 2009 short story collection by Terrence E. Holt
King's Valley
King's Valley II
Kings Valley, Oregon
Royal Valley (disambiguation)